The 2021 PDC Unicorn World Youth Championship was the eleventh edition of the PDC World Youth Championship, a tournament organised by the Professional Darts Corporation for darts players aged between 16 and 23. In a change from previous years, the whole tournament was played at Butlin's Minehead, Minehead, on 28 November 2021. The final took place on the stage, before the final of the 2021 Players Championship Finals.

England's Bradley Brooks was the defending champion after defeating compatriot Joe Davis 6–5 in the 2020 final, but lost 5–3 to Dutch player Kevin Doets in the second round (last 16).

Ted Evetts was crowned World Youth Champion for the first time after defeating Nathan Rafferty 6–4 in the final. As Evetts had already secured his World Championship spot, an additional qualifier was available at the PDPA World Championship Qualifier.

Prize money
The prize fund for the Youth Championship was reduced to £45,000 due to the smaller field of participants, with the winner still receiving £10,000. The winner also gets a spot at the 2022 PDC World Darts Championship and the 2022 Grand Slam of Darts, whereas the Runner-up gets also a place at the 2022 Grand Slam of Darts.

Qualifiers and Format
The smaller field of 32 players was made up of PDC Tour Card Holders, Development Tour players and International Qualifiers. Play in Minehead saw the 32 players compete in a round-robin format during the afternoon in Reds Bar, with the top two players in each group progressing to the last 16. The final was played on the main stage in the evening between the semi-finals and final of the Players Championship Finals.

Mike van Duivenbode, Bence Katona and Nico Kurz withdrew from the original field of qualifiers and were replaced by Lewis Pride, Maikel Verberk, and Jack Male, the next ranked players from the respective UK and European Orders of Merit.

The following players participated:

PDC Tour Card Holders
 
 
 
 
 
 
 
 
 
 

UK Development Tour Order of Merit
 
 
 
 
 
 
 
 
 
 

EU Development Tour Order of Merit
 
 
 
 
 
 
 
 
 

International Qualifiers
  – South-East Europe Qualifier
  – East Europe Qualifier
  – Hong Kong Qualifier
  – Japan Qualifier
  – South-West Europe Qualifier
  – West Europe Qualifier

Seedings
The top eight ranked players from the PDC Order of Merit are seeded at the time of the draw.

Draw

Group stage
All group matches are best of seven legs  After three games, the top two in each group qualify for the knock-out stage

NB: P = Played; W = Won; L = Lost; LF = Legs for; LA = Legs against;  = Plus/minus record, in relation to legs; Pts = Points; Avg = Three-dart average in group matches; Status = Qualified to knockout stage

Group A

Group B

Group C

Group D

Group E

Group F

Group G

Group H

Knockout stage

Representation
This table shows the number of players by country in the 2022 PDC World Youth Championship. A total of 12 nationalities were represented.

References

World Youth Championship
PDC World Youth Championship
PDC World Youth Championship
2021
PDC World Youth Championship